Alphonse Achille Souchard (17 May 1900 – 20 September 1976) was a French cyclist who competed in the road race at the 1920 Summer Olympics. He finished tenth individually and won a gold medal in the team time trial.

After winning several amateur races in 1922-23, including the French Road Championships, he turned professional, and won the national again title in 1925 and 1926. He rode the 1924 Tour de France, but did not finish.

References

External links

profile

1900 births
1976 deaths
French male cyclists
Olympic cyclists of France
Cyclists at the 1920 Summer Olympics
Olympic gold medalists for France
Sportspeople from Le Mans
Olympic medalists in cycling
Medalists at the 1920 Summer Olympics
Cyclists from Pays de la Loire
20th-century French people